Kadhaludan is a 2003 Indian Tamil-language romantic drama film directed by Rajakumaran. The film stars Murali, Devayani and Abbas. The film, produced by Devayani, was released on 14 February 2003, coinciding with the Valentine's Day.

Plot
Kalyan (Murali), a talented magician, works with his friend and assistant Ramesh (Ramesh Khanna). Kalyan's mother (Sathyapriya) insists him to get married soon and she finds a bride for him. Kalyan has a different view on marriage and he first wants to know all about his bride. With the marriage broker (Vaiyapuri) and Ramesh, Kalyan leaves his house to see his supposed bride.

The supposed bride Kavitha (Devayani) has a father Manickavasagar (T. S. Raghavendra). Kalyan then stalks her everywhere she goes. Kalyan slowly begins to fell under her spell and he even helps them to settle their debts.

One day, Kavitha attempts to commit suicide because her lover's father arranges a marriage for her lover. Durai (Abbas) and Kavitha were in love. Although Manickavasagar accepted for the marriage, Durai's father asked an expensive dowry. Durai promises to Kavitha that he will pay her dowry for the marriage and he then leaves her village.

Kavitha waits until now for Durai's return. Concerned about her past, Kalyan decides to find Durai. Thereafter, the old man Ajmal (Manivannan) tells to Kalyan that Durai is dead. Kalyan and Ramesh have no other choice than to lie to Kavitha concerning Durai. Later, Kalyan reveals to Manickavasagar that Durai is dead and that he is the real groom.

Durai, who supposed to be dead, comes back to get marry with Kavitha. Actually, Durai had a friend with the same name (Karunas) who died a few years ago. Kavitha and Durai get married without their parents' blessing but with the help of Kalyan. Kalyan, who cannot forget Kavitha, decides to stay a bachelor for a moment.

Cast

Murali as Kalyan
Devayani as Kavitha
Abbas as Durai
Ramesh Khanna as Ramesh
T. S. Raghavendra as Manickavasagar 
Radha Ravi as Durai's father
Vinu Chakravarthy as Pannayar
Vaiyapuri as a marriage broker
Karunas as Durai
Manivannan as Ajmal
Sathyapriya as Kalyan's mother
Anandaraj in a guest appearance
Madhan Bob in a guest appearance

Soundtrack

The film score and the soundtrack were composed by S. A. Rajkumar. The soundtrack, released in 2003, 6 features tracks with lyrics written by Viveka and Amuthabharathi.

Reception

Sify.com said : "The plot is idiotic, as director Rajakumaran has tried to rehash his earlier film Nee Varuvai Ena." and described the film as tedious. Malathi Rangarajan from Hindu.com described the film as a neat family drama, adding that : "The screenplay is hampered mainly by lengthy, meandering dialogue that proves tiresome". She praised Murali : "For Murali the role of a soft, caring hero is a cakewalk".

References

2003 films
Indian romantic drama films
2000s Tamil-language films
Films scored by S. A. Rajkumar
2003 romantic drama films